Maksym Lapyn (born 27 July 1975) is a Ukrainian diver. He competed in the men's 3 metre springboard event at the 1996 Summer Olympics.

References

External links
 

1975 births
Living people
Ukrainian male divers
Olympic divers of Ukraine
Divers at the 1996 Summer Olympics
Place of birth missing (living people)